Billy Graham (September 9, 1922 – January 22, 1992) was an American boxer from New York City who had an impressive professional record of 102 wins and 15 losses. Though a leading lightweight contender, Graham was never the recipient of a world title. Graham did however, have the remarkable distinction of never having been knocked off his feet in his long career. He was elected into the World Boxing Hall of Fame in 1987, and is also in the International Boxing Hall of Fame.

Early life and career
Graham was born on the East side of Manhattan on September 9, 1922. Graham defeated Sugar Ray Robinson as an amateur, when they were both teenagers in NYC. He was undefeated in his first 58 fights, going 52-0-6, until he fought Tony Pellone, where he lost by a split decision.

Boxing career
Graham was known as a welterweight with stylish and subtle moves that made him a difficult target in the ring.  He fought the legendary Kid Gavilán (commonly spelled Kid Gavilan) four times. In the first fight, held at Madison Square Garden, he beat Gavilan by a split decision. In the second fight, he lost at Madison Square Garden by a medical decision. The third fight was for the National Boxing Association World welterweight title and was again held at Madison Square Garden; this time, Gavilan won by a split decision. The final fight was for the World Welterweight Title in Havana, Cuba at Stadium Ball Park; Gavilan was again the victor, winning in a unanimous decision.

In a 2002 interview with The Observer, Budd Schulberg talked about mob involvement in boxing in the 1950s and how Gavilan both won and lost the welterweight championship due to mob interference.

"...Frankie Carbo, the mob's unofficial commissioner for boxing, controlled a lot of the welters and middles.... Not every fight was fixed, of course, but from time to time Carbo and his lieutenants, like Blinky Palermo in Philadelphia, would put the fix in. When the Kid Gavilan-Johnny Saxton fight was won by Saxton on a decision in Philadelphia in 1954, I was covering it for Sports Illustrated and wrote a piece at that time saying boxing was a dirty business and must be cleaned up now. It was an open secret. All the press knew that one - and other fights - were fixed. Gavilan was a mob-controlled fighter, too, and when he fought Billy Graham it was clear Graham had been robbed of the title. The decision would be bought. If it was close, the judges would shade it the way they had been told." 

Billy Graham also fought Carmen Basilio three times in his career. The first fight was held at Chicago Stadium; Graham won by a unanimous decision. Basilio won the second fight, held for the New York State Welterweight Title at Memorial Stadium in Syracuse, by a unanimous decision. The third and final fight was deemed a draw; Basilio kept his New York State Welterweight Title.

Life after boxing
After his boxing career, Graham worked for 35 years as a representative for liquor companies, 25 years for Seagram's. While employed by National Distillers, Graham made a guest appearance as an imposter for a police officer on the August 18, 1960 episode of the CBS game show To Tell the Truth. He  fooled the panel into thinking he was the officer, garnering two of the four possible votes from Kitty Carlisle and Jim Fleming. After all the votes were cast, Tom Poston recognized Graham's true identity.

Graham also worked as a boxing judge and referee.

Graham died of cancer at his home in West Islip, Long Island, New York, on January 22, 1992.

Professional boxing record

References

External links
 

1922 births
1992 deaths
Boxers from New York (state)
Welterweight boxers
International Boxing Hall of Fame inductees
American male boxers